|}

The Prince of Wales's Stakes is a Group 1 flat horse race in Great Britain open to horses aged four years or older. It is run at Ascot over a distance of 1 mile 1 furlong and 212 yards (2,004 metres), and it is scheduled to take place each year in June.

History
The event was established in 1862, and it was named after the Prince of Wales at that time, the future King Edward VII. The original version was restricted to three-year-olds, and it was contested over 1 mile and 5 furlongs.

The race was discontinued after World War II, when there was no Prince of Wales. It returned in 1968, a year before the investiture of Prince Charles. The distance of the new version was 1 mile and 2 furlongs, and it was now open to horses aged three or older.

The present system of race grading was introduced in 1971, and for a period the Prince of Wales's Stakes was classed at Group 2 level. It was promoted to Group 1 status in 2000, and at this point the minimum age of participating horses was raised to four.

The Prince of Wales's Stakes is currently held on the second day of the five-day Royal Ascot meeting.

Records
Most successful horse (2 wins):
 Connaught – 1969, 1970
 Mtoto – 1987, 1988
 Muhtarram – 1994, 1995

Leading jockey (6 wins):
 Morny Cannon – Matchmaker (1895), Shaddock (1896), Manners (1899), Simon Dale (1900), Rydal Head (1904), Plum Centre (1905)

Leading trainer (8 wins):
 John Porter – Ossory (1888), Watercress (1892), Matchmaker (1895), Shaddock (1896), Manners (1899), Simon Dale (1900), Rydal Head (1904), Plum Centre (1905)

Leading owner (5 wins):
 17th Earl of Derby – Stedfast (1911), Sansovino (1924), Caissot (1926), Hyperion (1933), Heliopolis (1939)
 Godolphin – Faithful Son (1998), Dubai Millennium (2000), Fantastic Light (2001), Grandera (2002), Rewilding (2011)

Winners since 1968

Earlier winners

 1862: Carisbrook
 1863: Avenger
 1864: Ely
 1865: Breadalbane
 1866: Rustic
 1867: Vauban
 1868: King Alfred
 1869: Martyrdom
 1870: King o'Scots
 1871: King of the Forest
 1872: Queen's Messenger
 1873: Kaiser
 1874: Leolinus
 1875: Earl of Dartrey
 1876: Petrarch
 1877: Glen Arthur
 1878: Glengarry
 1879: Wheel of Fortune
 1880: Zealot
 1881: Iroquois
 1882: Quicklime
 1883: Galliard
 1884: Sir Reuben
 1885: Pepper and Salt
 1886: Button Park
 1887: Claymore
 1888: Ossory
 1889: Donovan
 1890: Alloway
 1891: Melody
 1892: Watercress
 1893: Red Ensign
 1894: Contract
 1895: Matchmaker
 1896: Shaddock
 1897: Galtee More
 1898: Jeddah
 1899: Manners
 1900: Simon Dale
 1901: Veronese
 1902: Ard Patrick 1
 1903: Mead
 1904: Rydal Head
 1905: Plum Centre
 1906: Sancy
 1907: Qu'Appelle
 1908: Santo Strato
 1909: Bayardo
 1910: Greenback
 1911: Stedfast
 1912: Catmint
 1913: Louvois
 1914: Marten
 1915–18: no race
 1919: Dominion
 1920: All Prince
 1921: Polymestor
 1922: Villars
 1923: Eastern Monarch
 1924: Sansovino
 1925: Warminster
 1926: Caissot
 1927: Chantery
 1928: Potocki
 1929: Lyme Regis
 1930: Parenthesis
 1931: Sir Andrew
 1932: Sigiri
 1933: Hyperion
 1934: Achtenan
 1935: Assignation
 1936: Valerian
 1937: Cold Scent
 1938: L'Ouragan III
 1939: Heliopolis

1 Cupbearer finished first in 1902, but he was subsequently disqualified.

See also
 Horse racing in Great Britain
 List of British flat horse races

References
 Paris-Turf:
 Racing Post:

 galopp-sieger.de – Prince of Wales's Stakes.
 ifhaonline.org – International Federation of Horseracing Authorities – Prince of Wales's Stakes (2019).
 pedigreequery.com – Prince of Wales's Stakes – Ascot.
 

Flat races in Great Britain
Ascot Racecourse
Open middle distance horse races
Recurring sporting events established in 1862
British Champions Series
1862 establishments in England